Alvydas is a masculine Lithuanian given name. Notable people with the name include:

Alvydas Baležentis (born 1949), Lithuanian politician
Alvydas Duonėla (born 1976),  Lithuanian sprint canoeist
Alvydas Nikžentaitis (born 1961), Lithuanian historian
Alvydas Pazdrazdis (born 1972), basketball player

Lithuanian masculine given names